The Baker & Dale was a British cyclecar manufactured in Southbourne, Sussex, in 1913.

It was designed by a T.A. Hubert and used a twin cylinder engine of unknown make and belt drive to the rear axle.

See also
 List of car manufacturers of the United Kingdom

References

Vintage vehicles
Cyclecars
Defunct motor vehicle manufacturers of England
Vehicle manufacturing companies established in 1913